Salal (sometimes called Salel) is a newly appointed province in Somaliland. Before its formation in mid 2009, the province was part of the Awdal region.

Currently, Zeila is the regional seat of the government.

See also
Awdal
Regions of Somaliland

References

External links

Somaliland official website
Somaliland BBC Country Profile
Update on the Situation in the Somaliland

Geography of Somaliland